The Long Farewell is a Soviet film drama directed by Kira Muratova.

It was filmed in 1971, but it was put on a shelf and was only released on the screens in perestroika in 1987.

Plot
For a long time, Yevgenia Vasilyevna was busy only with her son Sasha. With the advent of free time, as her son grew older, Nikolai Sergeyevich began to look after her. In the summer, the son went to visit his father. After his return, he began to change. His mother understands that her son wants to leave, but she does not have enough wisdom to behave properly in the current situation.

Cast
 Zinaida Sharko as Yevgenia Vasilyevna Ustinova
 Oleg Vladimirsky as  Sasha Ustinov
 Yuri Kayurov as Nikolai Sergeyevich
 Lidia Dranovskaya  as Vykhodtseva
 Viktor Ilchenko as Pavel Konstantinovich
 Lidiya Brazilskaya as Tonya
 Svetlana Kabanova as  Tatiana Kartseva

Awards and nominations
1987
 Nika Award — Best Film, Best Director (Kira Muratova), Best Actress (Zinaida Sharko),  Best Cinematographer (Gennadi Karyuk): nom
 All-Union Film Festival — Grand Prix Jury: win
 Locarno Festival — FIPRESCI Award: win

References

External links
 
 Sergey Kudryavtsev's Review

Soviet drama films
1971 drama films
Odesa Film Studio films
Films directed by Kira Muratova
1971 films